The 2015–16 Women's EHF Champions League was the 23rd edition of the Women's EHF Champions League, the competition for top women's clubs of Europe, organized and supervised by the European Handball Federation.

CSM București won trophy in their European debut season by defeating Győri Audi ETO KC 29–26 in the big final.

Overview

Team allocation
14 teams were directly qualified for the group stage.

TH = Title holders

Round and draw dates
All draws held at the European Handball Federation headquarters in Vienna, Austria.

Qualification stage

The draw was held on 26 June 2015. The teams played a semifinal and final to determine the last participants. Matches were played on 12 and 13 September 2015.

Seedings
The seedings were announced on 23 June 2015.

Qualification tournament 1

Qualification tournament 2

Group stage

The draw was held on 26 June 2015.

Group A

Group B

Group C

Group D

Main round

Group 1

Group 2

Knockout stage

Quarterfinals

Final four

Final

Awards and statistics

Top goalscorers
Statistics exclude qualifying rounds and play-off round.

All-Star Team
The all-star team and awards were announced on 6 May 2016.

Goalkeeper: 
Right wing: 
Right back: 
Centre back: 
Left back: 
Left wing: 
Pivot:

Other awards
MVP of the Final Four: 
Best Coach: 
Best Young Player: 
Best Defence Player:

References

External links
Official website

 
Women's EHF Champions League
EHF
EHF